The 2020–21 NCAA Division II men's ice hockey season began on February 5, 2021 and concluded on March 14 of the same year. This was the 39th season of second-tier college ice hockey.

Regular season
Due to COVID-19 concerns, the Northeast-10 Conference announced in July that all league activities would be suspended through the end of the 2020 calendar year. As all Division II programs played in the Northeast-10, this put the entire D-II season in jeopardy. Eventually all of the schools decided to cancel their seasons except for one. Franklin Pierce soldiered on by themselves, playing just six games against three opponents (all Division III).

Standings

See also
 2020–21 NCAA Division I men's ice hockey season
 2020–21 NCAA Division III men's ice hockey season

References

External links

 
NCAA